Clamp Double Feature may refer to two films that were released in Japan on August 20, 2005.
 Tsubasa Reservoir Chronicle: Princess of the Birdcage Kingdom
 xxxHolic: A Midsummer Night's Dream